The 1928 Nebraska gubernatorial election was held on November 6, 1928, and featured former Mayor of Falls City Arthur J. Weaver, a Republican, defeating Democratic nominee, former Governor Charles W. Bryan.

Democratic primary

Candidates
Charles W. Bryan, former Governor
James F. Christie

Results

Republican primary

Candidates
Roy M. Harrop
Robert G. Ross
Arthur J. Weaver, attorney and former Mayor of Falls City

Results

General election

Results

References

Gubernatorial
1928
Nebraska
November 1928 events in the United States